The Lithuanian National Time Trial Championships have been held since 1995.

Men

U23

Women

See also
Lithuanian National Road Race Championships
National road cycling championships

References

National road cycling championships
Cycle racing in Lithuania
Recurring sporting events established in 1995
1995 establishments in Lithuania
National championships in Lithuania